Sejo of Joseon (2 November 1417 – 23 September 1468), personal name Yi Yu (Korean: 이유; Hanja: 李瑈), sometimes known as Grand Prince Suyang (Korean: 수양대군; Hanja: 首陽大君), was the seventh ruler of the Joseon dynasty of Korea. He was the second son of Sejong the Great and the uncle of King Danjong, against whom he led a coup d'état in 1455.

Biography

Early life 
Born in 1417 as the fourth child and second son of Grand Prince Chungnyeong (future King Sejong) by his primary wife, Lady Shim of the Cheongsong Shim clan (future Queen Soheon), he showed great ability at archery, horse riding and martial arts, and was also a brilliant military commander, though he never went to the battlefront himself. In 1428, he received the title Grand Prince Suyang by which he is better known.

Rise to power 
Following the death of King Sejong in 1450, Suyang's ill brother, Yi Hyang (later known as King Munjong), took the throne but died two years later, and the crown passed to his 12-year-old son, Yi Hong-wi (posthumously named King Danjong). The new monarch was too young to rule the nation, and the government was controlled by Chief State Councillor Hwangbo In and General Gim Jong-seo, who was the Left State Councillor. As Gim Jong-seo and his faction used the chance to extend the power of court officials against royal family members, the tension between him and Suyang greatly increased; not only Suyang himself, but his younger brother, Grand Prince Anpyeong, also sought an opportunity to take control of the country.

In order to court the support of the Ming dynasty, Suyang became an ambassador in 1452. He also surrounded himself with trusted allies, including his famous tactician, Han Myeong-hoe, who advised him to take over the government in a coup. In 1453, Suyang killed Gim Jong-seo and his faction, thereby taking the reins of power into his own hands. After the coup, he arrested his own brother, Grand Prince Anpyeong, first sending him into exile, then sentencing him to death.

Reign 
Finally, in 1455 Suyang forced the powerless king to abdicate, declaring himself the new ruler of Joseon (today known by the temple name "Sejo").

After his younger brother Grand Prince Geumsung, and six scholars, including Seong Sam-mun, Park Paeng-nyeon and Yi Gae, plotted to remove him from power in an attempt to put his nephew back on the throne, Suyang demoted the former king from "King Emeritus" (Sangwang; 상왕, 上王) to "Prince Nosan" (Nosan Gun; 노산군, 魯山君) and later ordered him to commit suicide by poison.

Despite having snatched the throne from his young nephew and killing many people in the process, Sejo proved himself one of the ablest rulers and administrators in Korean history. First, he continued King Taejong's legacy of strengthening the monarchy by weakening the power of the State Council and bringing the officials directly under the king's control. He also further developed the administrative system, which had also been introduced by Taejong, enabling the government to determine exact population numbers and to mobilize troops effectively (this caused Yi Si-ae's Rebellion, which he suppressed). Just like Taejong, Sejo was a hardliner concerning foreign policy and attacked the Jurchens on the northern front in 1460 (오랑캐, 兀良哈) and 1467 (호리개, 胡里改). He also revised the land ordinance to improve the national economy and encouraged the publication of history, economy, agriculture, and religion books.

Sejo himself compiled a number of books based on his interests. One of them is Seokbosangjeol, a biography of Gautama Buddha. The others are Worinseokbo (월인석보, 月印釋譜) and Yeokdaebyeongyo (역대병요, 歷代兵要).

Most importantly, he compiled the Grand Code for State Administration, which became the cornerstone of dynastic administration and provided the first form of written constitutional law in Korea.

Death 
Sejo died in 1468, and the throne passed to his sickly second son, Yi Hwang (Yejong of Joseon). His tomb is known as Gwangneung (광릉) and is located in Namyangju, Gyeonggi Province, South Korea.

Family
Father: King Sejong of Joseon (조선 세종) (15 May 1397 – 8 April 1450)
Grandfather: King Taejong of Joseon (조선 태종) (13 June 1367 – 30 May 1422)
Grandmother: Queen Wongyeong of the Yeoheung Min clan (원경왕후 민씨) (29 July 1365 – 18 August 1420)
Mother: Queen Soheon of the Cheongsong Shim clan (소헌왕후 심씨) (12 October 1395 – 19 April 1446)
Grandfather: Shim On (심온) (1375 – 18 January 1419)
Grandmother: Lady Ahn of the Sunheung Ahn clan (순흥 안씨) (? – 1444)
Consorts and their respective issue(s):
 Queen Jeonghui of the Papyeong Yun clan (정희왕후 윤씨) (8 December 1418 – 6 May 1483)
 Yi Jang, Crown Prince Uigyeong (의경세자 이장) (1438 – 2 September 1457), first son
 Princess Uiryeong (의령공주), first daughter — Disputed.
 Princess Uisuk (의숙공주) (1442 – 3 December 1477), second daughter
 Yi Hwang, Grand Prince Haeyang (해양대군 이황) (14 January 1450 – 31 December 1469), third son
 Royal Noble Consort Geun of the Seonsan Park clan (근빈 박씨) (1425 – ?)
 Yi Seo, Prince Deokwon (덕원군 이서) (6 March 1449 – 22 July 1498), second son
 Yi Seong, Prince Changwon (창원군 이성) (1458 – 1484), fourth son
 Deposed Royal Consort So-yong of the Park clan (폐소용 박씨) (? – 1465)
 Prince Yi A-ji (왕자 이아지) (1459 – 1563), fifth son

Ancestry

In popular culture
 Portrayed by Kim Al-eum in the 1983 MBC TV series The King of Chudong Palace.
 Portrayed by Nam Sung-woo in the 1984–1985 MBC TV series 500 Years of Joseon: The Ume Tree in the Midst of the Snow.
 Portrayed by Seo In-seok in the 1994 KBS2 TV series Han Myung-hoi.
 Portrayed by Im Dong-jin in the 1998–2000 KBS1 TV series The King and Queen.
 Portrayed by Choi Bong-sik in the 2007 KBS2 TV series Sayuksin.
 Portrayed by Kim Byung-se in the 2007–2008 SBS TV series The King and I.
 Portrayed by Kim Yeong-cheol in the 2011 KBS2 TV series The Princess' Man.
 Portrayed by Kim Young-ho in the 2011 JTBC TV series Insu, The Queen Mother.
 Portrayed by Lee Jung-jae in the 2013 film The Face Reader.
 Portrayed by Go Young-bin in the 2016 KBS1 TV series Jang Yeong-sil.
Portrayed by Park Hee-soon in the 2019 film Jesters: The Game Changers.

See also
 List of monarchs of Korea
 Korean–Jurchen border conflicts

Notes

1417 births
1468 deaths
15th-century Korean monarchs
Joseon Buddhists
Korean Buddhist monarchs
Regents of Korea
People from Seoul